Thakra is a village in the Gujar Khan Tehsil of Rawalpindi District in the Punjab province of Pakistan. It links Rawalpindi, Chakwal and Jhelum.

Location 
Nearest places within 200 km of Mohra Thakra

Main castes  

Thakra Mohra castes include Syed, Qureshis, Thakurs, Awans, Rajputs, Choudries, Bhattis, Wazirs, Lohars, Turkhans, Mochis, Kashmiris, Julahay, Kumhar, Musallis and Maashkis.

Religion 

Thakra is Sunni majority village with Shia in minority. Four Sunni and one Shia mosque and one Shia Imambargah (Imambarha / قصر اسیر بغداد). There are two tombs (dargah / Darbar) of Shias in the village.

Politics  
Before Partition Sikhs used to live in this village with Muslims. After partition, Sikh left and their homes are occupied by Muslim families and now counsellor is from N league and PPP.

Land and crops  

Thakra Mohra has fertile lands where crops including wheat, groundnut, maize, barley, masoor and gram are grown. Half of its lands are irrigated by the Narali Dam. Most of the cultivable lands are owned by the Thakurs and the Awans. Most of the water-wells have dried up, threatening the village's future.

Education  

The village offers a middle school for girls and a primary school for boys. There is no high school. Literacy rate is low. People are not well qualified. There is no hospital or clinic in this village. Few compounders are acting as doctor and scamming poor people.

Development
Gas, electricity and digital telephone with many subscribers of high-speed internet.

References

Villages in Gujar Khan Tehsil